Pontevedra is a province of Spain along the country's Atlantic coast in southwestern Europe. The province forms the southwestern part of the autonomous community of Galicia. It is bordered by the provinces of A Coruña, Lugo, and Ourense, the country of Portugal and the Atlantic Ocean. The official languages of the Pontevedra province are Spanish and Galician. There is a public institution called the Provincial Deputation of Pontevedra (Provincial Council), whose head office is in Pontevedra city, that provides direct services to citizens such as technical, financial and technological support to the councils of the 62 municipalities of the province of Pontevedra.

The population of the province is 942,665 (2019), of whom 9% live in the capital, the city of Pontevedra and 28% in Vigo.

Geography
Pontevedra is cut in two parts by the Lérez River. Most of the major tourist attractions in Pontevedra are to the south of the river. Pontevedra features many historical buildings, monuments, and churches.

Much of the Rías Baixas Denominación de Origen (DO) is located in the province. The province similarly shares the Atlantic Islands of Galicia National Park with neighbouring A Coruña province. This region contains the Galician islands of Ons, Cies, Sálvora and Cortegada.

Climate
The province has an oceanic climate with warm and relatively dry summers and cool and very wet winters.

Demographics
The province's capital, Pontevedra, with a population of 83,260 (2020) is not the largest city of its province, the largest municipality is the industrial Vigo with a population of 293,837. In addition, there are 62 municipalities in the province. Other relevant municipalities, based on their populations, are Vilagarcía de Arousa (37,456), Redondela (29,218), Cangas (26,542), Marín (24,319), Ponteareas (22,877), A Estrada (20,479), Lalín (20,218), and O Porriño (19,848).

Counties
 O Baixo Miño county
 Caldas county
 O Condado county
 O Deza county
 O Morrazo county
 A Paradanta county
 Pontevedra county
 O Salnés county
 Tabeirós – Terra de Montes county
 Vigo county

See also
 Galician wine

Notes and references

External links